
Oedipus was the mythical king of Thebes. 

Oedipus may also refer to:
 Oedipus (horse), an American Thoroughbred racehorse

Plays
 Oedipus Rex, an Athenian tragedy by Sophocles
 Oedipus at Colonus, an Athenian tragedy by Sophocles
 Oedipus (Euripides), a mostly lost play
 Oedipus (Seneca), a Latin-language tragedy by Seneca the Younger
 Oedipus (Dryden), an English-language tragedy by John Dryden
 Oedipus (Voltaire), a French-language tragedy by Voltaire

Operas
 Œdipe (opera), by George Enescu
 Oedipus rex (opera), by Igor Stravinsky
 Oedipus, by Wolfgang Rihm
Greek (opera), by Mark-Anthony Turnage

Modern music
Oedipus (band), an American rock band
 "Oedipus", a song by Regina Spektor on the album Songs
Oedipus (DJ), the long-time program director of WBCN in Boston

Films
Oedipus Rex (film), a 1967 Italian film directed by Pier Paolo Pasolini

Oedipus complex
 Oedipus complex, a psychological theory
 Oedipina complex, the Gamboa worm salamander, formerly known as Oedipus complex

Zoology
Oedipus Berthold, 1827, a junior synonym of the insect genus Locusta (migratory locust)
Oedipus Tschudi, 1838, an invalid name for the amphibian genus Bolitoglossa
Oedipus Lesson, 1840, an invalid name for the primate genus Saguinus (tamarins)
Oedipus Dana, 1852, an invalid name for the crustacean genus Coralliocaris
Oedipus Menge, 1876, an invalid name for some spiders in the family Salticidae (jumping spiders)

Characters
 Stinkor, original name Oedipus (He-man and the masters of the universe) anime